Serhiy Priymak (born 25 December 1957) is a Ukrainian sailor. He competed in the Tornado event at the 1996 Summer Olympics.

References

External links
 

1957 births
Living people
Ukrainian male sailors (sport)
Olympic sailors of Ukraine
Sailors at the 1996 Summer Olympics – Tornado
Place of birth missing (living people)
20th-century Ukrainian people